Mafia State: how one reporter became an enemy of the brutal new Russia is a 2011 book by British journalist Luke Harding.

Synopsis
Mafia State recounts Harding's period as Russia correspondent for Britain's Guardian newspaper and the surveillance and espionage he was subject to; he alleges the Federal Security Service (FSB) was involved.

Reception
In The Guardian A.D. Miller wrote "the importance of Luke Harding's book lies in its first-hand account of a relatively mild but telling bout of state-sponsored harassment" whilst in the New Statesman David Clark of the Russian Foundation described the book as "absorbing" and wrote "the author's descriptive powers and his insights into the mentality and techniques of Putinism are enough to make Mafia State an essential read, but events have conspired to make it a timely one as well". A lengthy review was also published in the London Review of Books.

References

2011 non-fiction books
Books about intelligence agencies
Books about post-Soviet Russia
English-language books
English non-fiction books
Guardian Books books
Non-fiction books about espionage
The Guardian